Matthew Wolff is an American graphic designer known for his work designing sports logos and jerseys, particularly for association football teams. He is also a co-founder of Vermont Green FC, an amateur soccer team in Burlington, Vermont.

Biography 
Wolff was born in 1990 in New York City but raised in Minneapolis and London. He attended St. Paul Academy and Summit School in Saint Paul, Minnesota. He then matriculated to Skidmore College, where he played as a forward on the school's NCAA Division III soccer team. He graduated from Skidmore in 2012 with a degree in management and business. He then went on to study graphic design at Parsons School of Design.

After graduating from Parsons, he began work as a graphic designer for Upper 90 Soccer, a soccer equipment retailer in New York City. He then took a job as the lead art director for New York City FC. He created the new club's crest logo as well as their jerseys, billboards, and other marketing materials. He then went on to work for Nike, Inc. as a graphic designer in their global football apparel department. At Nike, he designed the 2018 FIFA World Cup kits for the national association football teams of Nigeria and France. The Nigeria kits were quickly sold out and broke pre-order records, and they were nominated for a Beazley Design of the Year award. He also designed the crest for Los Angeles FC.

In 2021, Wolff co-founded Vermont Green FC, an amateur team based in Burlington, Vermont playing in USL League Two. He also designed the team's crest and branding, which was unveiled in February 2022. The team places an emphasis on environmental activism, and Wolff says he has been working with manufacturers to make the team's jerseys out of recycled and sustainable materials.

In 2022, Wolff designed the logos and uniforms for the Minnesota Twins of Major League Baseball. Wolff grew up a fan of the team.

Designs 

Below is a list of some of the teams Wolff has designed crests for:
 Brookhattan FC
 Central Coast United FC
 Charleston Battery
 Chicago Fire FC
 Green Bay Voyageurs FC
 One Knoxville SC
 Los Angeles FC
 Racing Louisville FC
 Louisville City FC
 Minneapolis City SC
 NJ/NY Gotham FC
 New York City FC (with Rafael Esquer and Milo Kowalski)
 Union Omaha
 Oakland County FC
 Oakland Roots SC
 San Diego Wave FC (with Jeremy Nelson)
 FC Tulsa
 Vermont Green FC
 Victoria Highlanders FC
 Virginia Beach City FC

References

External links 

 

Artists from New York City
Artists from Minneapolis
Skidmore Thoroughbreds men's soccer players
Parsons School of Design alumni
Nike, Inc. people
New York City FC non-playing staff
American graphic designers
1990 births

Living people